Kerem Özkan (born 19 November 1988) is a Turkish professional basketball player, who lastly played for Büyükçekmece of Turkish Super League (BSL).

External links
TBLStat.net Profile

1988 births
Living people
Adanaspor Basketbol players
Beşiktaş men's basketball players
Büyükçekmece Basketbol players
Oyak Renault basketball players
Sakarya BB players
Small forwards
TED Ankara Kolejliler players
Turkish men's basketball players